David John Profumo, FRSL (born 20 October 1955), is an English novelist.

Profumo was born in London, the son of former British government minister John Profumo, and his wife, actress Valerie Hobson. The Profumo family is of Italian origin.

Biography
Profumo was educated at Eton College and Magdalen College, Oxford. He was Assistant Master of English at Eton in 1978 and at Shrewsbury School from 1978 to 1979. He then became part-time lecturer of English at King's College London, from 1981 to 1983 and Deputy Editor of Fiction Magazine from 1982 to 1984. He was a columnist for The Daily Telegraph from 1987 to 1995.

Profumo was elected a Fellow of the Royal Society of Literature in 1995.

Profumo married BBC Television producer Helen Fraser, daughter of Alasdair Fraser, former Consultant Gynaecologist at St Mary's Hospital, on 22 March 1979 at St Marylebone Parish Church, Marylebone, London. They have a son Alexander James Profumo.

Profumo's 2006 family memoir, Bringing the House Down, covered the scandal brought about by his father's affair with Christine Keeler.

Bibliography

Books

Novels
 Sea Music London, Secker and Warburg, 1988.
 The Weather in Iceland London, Picador, 1993.

Non-fiction
 In Praise of Trout. London, Viking, 1989.
 The Magic Wheel: An Anthology of Fishing Literature . Editor, with Graham Swift, London, Picador, 1985
 Bringing the House Down: A Family Memoir, 2006

Short fiction

Essays and reporting

References

1955 births
Living people
People educated at Eton College
Alumni of Magdalen College, Oxford
Academics of King's College London
20th-century English novelists
English people of Irish descent
English people of Italian descent
Fellows of the Royal Society of Literature
English male novelists
Country Life (magazine) people
20th-century English male writers